Ancylolomia castaneata is a moth in the family Crambidae. It was described by George Hampson in 1919. It is found in South Africa.

References

Endemic moths of South Africa
Ancylolomia
Moths described in 1919
Moths of Africa